Bath Newbridge is a proposed new heritage railway station on the outskirts of Bath. It is the proposed southern terminus station of the Avon Valley Railway.

References

Proposed railway stations in England